Colfax County is the name of two counties in the United States:

 Colfax County, Nebraska 
 Colfax County, New Mexico